American hip hop recording artist Iamsu! has released five studio albums, nine mixtapes and 25 singles (including 18 as a featured artist).

Albums

Studio albums

EPs

Mixtapes

Singles

As lead artist

As featured artist

Other charted song

Guest appearances

References 

Discographies of American artists
Hip hop discographies